Lajos Aulich (25 August 1793 – 6 October 1849) was the third Minister of War of Hungary.

A professional soldier and lieutenant colonel in the Austrian Army, he fought against Habsburg oppression.

At them time of the War of Hungarian Independence (1848–1849) during the Spring Campaign, Aulich commanded an army, who gathered, and prepared for the great Battle of Isaszeg.   
 
He became a honvédség (Hungarian Army) colonel on 2 October 1848, and was named General at the Battle of Kápolna. He was a stickler for the rules: when Lajos Kossuth sent him requests, he answered: "please work through Görgey." Due to his gout, he was relieved of field duty and appointed Minister of War on 14 July 1849. He was executed less than three months later as one of the 13 Martyrs of Arad.

References

 Kedves Gyula: Aulich Lajos, In: Hermann Róbert (szerkesztette): Vértanúk könyve, Budapest, 2007, 89–94. o.
 Csorba László: A tizenhárom aradi vértanú, Budapest, 1989, 154–169. o.
 
Új magyar életrajzi lexikon I. (A–Cs). Főszerk. Markó László. Budapest: Magyar Könyvklub. 2001. 228. o. 
 Magyar életrajzi lexikon Aulich Lajos szócikk
 Révai nagy lexikona II. köt. (Arány–Beke). Budapest: Révai Testvérek Irodalmi Intézet Részvénytársaság, 132. o. (1911)
 
 

1793 births
1849 deaths
Politicians from Bratislava
Hungarian-German people
Defence ministers of Hungary
Executed Hungarian people
The 13 Martyrs of Arad
Military personnel from Bratislava